Blue Parade is the first full-length album by Canadian artist Sarah Slean.

Track listing

 "Playing Cards with Judas"
 "Bonnie's Song"
 "My Invitation"
 "Before Your Time"
 "Habit"
 "Twin Moon"
 "Awake Soon"
 "High"
 "Eliot"
 "Blue Parade"
 "Narcolepsy Weed"
 "I Want to be Brave (Madeleine)" (hidden track)

Personnel
 All songs by Sarah Slean
 Sarah Slean - vocals, piano, wurlitzer, toy piano, rhodes
 Mark Mariash - drums, djembe, maracas, crazy moog on "Habit", glockenspiel on "Eliot", finger cymbals
 Drew Birston - bass, except for tracks 6 and 9
 Maury Lafoy - bass on track 6 and 9
 Kurt Swinghammer - guitars, electric sitar, moog bass on "High", feedback, e-bow, lap steel, loveton
 Kevin Fox - cello except track 11
 Todd Lumley - Hammond B3, accordion
 Erin Donovan - vibraphone on track 2
 Hayden - guest appearing on "Madeleine"

Sarah Slean albums